Eating Raoul is a 1982 American black comedy film written, directed by and starring Paul Bartel with Mary Woronov, Robert Beltran, Ed Begley Jr., Buck Henry, and Susan Saiger. It is about a prudish married couple (Bartel and Woronov) who resort to killing and robbing affluent swingers to earn money for their dream restaurant.

The writers commissioned a single-issue comic book based on the film for promotion; it was created by underground comix creator Kim Deitch.

Plot
Paul Bland is a balding wine snob who works at a cheap wine shop. His attractive wife Mary is a nurse who is routinely groped by hospital patients. When Paul is fired, they are left with barely enough money to survive and fear that they will never realize their dream of opening a restaurant. Paul and Mary sleep in separate twin beds since they are prudes who disapprove of sex. They live in an apartment building which regularly hosts swingers parties, which they despise.

When a drunk swinger wanders into their apartment and tries to rape Mary, Paul hits him on the head with a cast-iron frying pan, unintentionally killing him. Thinking that no one will miss him, they take his money and put his body in the trash compactor. After they kill another swinger the same way, they realize they can make money by killing "rich perverts".

Doris the Dominatrix, a regular at the swingers parties, advises Paul and Mary to place an ad in the Hollywood Press, which caters to men seeking kinky sex scenes. Mary lures men to the apartment by promising to satisfy their sexual fetishes; when they try to have sex with her, Paul grows alarmed enough to kill them with the frying pan. The Blands are surprised at how lucrative their scheme is.

The Blands have new locks installed in their apartment to protect Paul's wine collection. The locksmith is Raoul Mendoza, whose service is a ruse which allows him to rob his customers' homes. He sneaks into the Blands' apartment the next night and stumbles across the corpse of their latest victim. Paul confronts Raoul and both men realize they are in a compromising position. They strike a deal: neither will report the other to the police, Paul and Mary will pocket their victims' cash, and Raoul will keep their other possessions — splitting any proceeds with them — and dispose of the bodies.

When a client of Mary's fails to show one night, Paul leaves to buy groceries and a new frying pan, since Mary is squeamish about cooking in the one they use to kill people. While Mary is alone, the client arrives late and tries to rape her. Raoul drops by and strangles the client to death. He offers Mary a joint and they have sex. After Paul grows suspicious, he follows Raoul and discovers he has been selling the victims' bodies to a dog food company, selling their expensive cars, and secretly keeping the money.

Raoul tries to persuade Mary to run away with him after they have sex again. He nearly runs down Paul with a car, so Paul hires Doris the Dominatrix to use her costuming and role-playing skills to get rid of him. She poses as an immigration agent threatening Raoul, a Mexican immigrant, with deportation. She pretends to be a public health worker who diagnoses him with venereal disease. The pills she promises will cure him are actually saltpeter tablets which render him impotent. These schemes fail to deter Raoul's interest in Mary.

The Blands fear they will lose the property they wish to buy for the restaurant to another buyer. To quickly earn more cash, they attend a swingers party in search of victims. Mr. Leech, a bank lender who earlier refused to loan Mary money after she rejected his sexual advances, sees her at the party and propositions her. Mary kills him with a rattail comb and throws his body from a window. While Paul and Mary try to retrieve Mr. Leech's possessions, the party's host demands they join the nude guests in the hot tub or leave. Paul loses his temper and hurls an electric space heater into the hot tub, killing all of the partygoers and enabling him and Mary to take their money and sell their cars.

A drunken Raoul breaks into the Blands' apartment and threatens to kill Paul for not sharing the money earned from the swingers' cars. He announces that he intends to wed Mary and tells her to kill Paul with the frying pan. Instead, Mary lures Raoul into the kitchen and murders him.

Mary confesses her affair with Raoul to Paul, who tells her that he already knows. The Blands suddenly remember that James, the real estate agent who is helping them buy the property for the restaurant, will arrive for dinner soon. With no meat in the house and no time to go grocery shopping, they cook Raoul and serve him for dinner, describing the dish as "Spanish". The Blands buy the building for their new restaurant, Paul and Mary's Country Kitchen.

Cast
 Paul Bartel as Paul Bland
 Mary Woronov as Mary Bland
 Robert Beltran as Raoul Mendoza
 Susan Saiger as Doris the Dominatrix
 Ed Begley Jr. as Hippie
 Buck Henry as Mr. Leech (bank manager)
 Edie McClurg as Susan (woman in fur at swingers party)
 Richard Paul as Mr. Cray (liquor store owner)
 John Shearin as Mr. Baker
 Darcy Pulliam as Sheila the Nurse
 Hamilton Camp as John Peck - Dishonest Wine Buyer
 Allan Rich as Nazi
 John Paragon as Sex Shop Owner

Critical reception
Roger Ebert gave Eating Raoul two stars, explaining, "The movie's got some really funny stuff in it, and I liked a lot of it, and I wouldn't exactly advise not seeing it, but it doesn't quite go that last mile. It doesn't reach for the truly unacceptable excesses, the transcendent breaches of taste, that might have made it inspired instead of merely clever."

Vincent Canby of The New York Times wrote, "One mustn't blunt its pleasures by calling it a laff riot. It is full of smiles, punctuated here and there by marvelously unseemly guffaws, but most of the time it works its little wonders quietly. The comic style is purposely flat, plain and ordinary, like a piece of Pop art."

Rotten Tomatoes gives the film a score of 86%, with an average rating of 6.8 out of 10, based on 21 reviews. The website's "Critics Consensus" for the film reads, "Eating Raoul serves up its spectacularly lurid tale with a healthy heaping of pitch-black humor and anarchic vigor."

Home media
On April 13, 2004, the long out-of-print film was released on DVD by Columbia TriStar Home Entertainment.

On September 25, 2012, The Criterion Collection re-released the film on DVD and Blu-ray.

Legacy
Woronov and Bartel later appeared together as Mary and Paul Bland in a cameo in the film Chopping Mall (1986). Woronov and Beltran appeared together again in Night of the Comet (1984), though not as their Eating Raoul characters; the two also starred together in Bartel's critically acclaimed follow-up feature Scenes from the Class Struggle in Beverly Hills in 1989.

Musical
Eating Raoul, a stage musical adaptation, was presented Off-Broadway in 1992, and also played at the Bridewell Theatre, London, in 2000.

Planned sequel
A sequel, titled Bland Ambition, was planned. The script was written by Paul Bartel and Richard Blackburn. As described by Bartel:

Bland Ambition was about 10 days from the start of filming in April 1989 when Vestron withdrew its financial backing.

References

External links
 
 
 
 
 
 Eating Raoul: Murder Most Delicious an essay by David Ehrenstein at the Criterion Collection

1980s comedy horror films
1980s black comedy films
1982 films
1982 horror films
American black comedy films
American comedy horror films
American independent films
BDSM in films
Films about cannibalism
Films directed by Paul Bartel
Films set in Los Angeles
Films shot in Los Angeles
1982 comedy films
1980s English-language films
1980s American films